The 1979 Valencia City Council election, also the 1979 Valencia municipal election, was held on Tuesday, 3 April 1979, to elect the 1st City Council of the municipality of Valencia. All 33 seats in the City Council were up for election. The election was held simultaneously with local elections all throughout Spain.

Electoral system
The City Council of Valencia was the top-tier administrative and governing body of the municipality of Valencia, composed of the mayor, the government council and the elected plenary assembly.

Voting for the local assembly was on the basis of universal suffrage, which comprised all nationals over 18 years of age, registered in the municipality of Valencia and in full enjoyment of their civil and political rights. Local councillors were elected using the D'Hondt method and a closed list proportional representation, with an electoral threshold of five percent of valid votes—which included blank ballots—being applied in each local council. Councillors were allocated to municipal councils based on the following scale:

The mayor was indirectly elected by the plenary assembly. A legal clause required that mayoral candidates earned the vote of an absolute majority of councillors, or else the candidate of the most-voted party in the assembly was to be automatically appointed to the post. In the event of a tie, the eldest one would be elected.

The electoral law allowed for parties and federations registered in the interior ministry, coalitions and groupings of electors to present lists of candidates. Parties and federations intending to form a coalition ahead of an election were required to inform the relevant Electoral Commission within fifteen days of the election call, whereas groupings of electors needed to secure the signature of at least one-thousandth of the electorate in the constituencies for which they sought election—with a compulsory minimum of 500 signatures—disallowing electors from signing for more than one list of candidates.

Results

References

Valencia
Elections in Valencia